Leonardo Borges de Azevedo (born February 1, 1985), known as Léo Borges, is a Brazilian footballer who plays for Damash Iranian F.C. in the Azadegan League.

Club career
Borges joined Damash Iranian F.C. in 2010.

References

1985 births
Living people
Brazilian footballers
Brazilian expatriate footballers
Expatriate footballers in Iran
Damash Iranian players
CR Vasco da Gama players
Association football midfielders
Footballers from Brasília